Graham R. Hunt (born April 21, 1979) is an American businessman and politician of the Republican Party. He is a former member of the Washington House of Representatives, representing the 2nd Legislative District.

Career
Hunt served in the Arizona Air National Guard from 1998 to 2005. In 2010 Hunt was selected by the Orting City Council to fill the position vacated by former Councilmember Joachim Pestinger. The following year, Hunt ran unopposed to retain his seat. Hunt served as the chair for the Transportation Committee and co-chair for Public Safety.

Hunt was appointed to the state legislature on January 17, 2014, by the Thurston County Board of Commissioners and Pierce County County Council, despite being the second choice of the Republican Precinct Committee Officers from the district. He was sworn in the following day. Hunt then went on to win the general election in 2014, receiving 62.53% of the vote. Hunt served on the House Appropriations Committee, Business and Financial Services and was the Assistant Ranking on the Labor Committee.

Military service controversy 

In January 2015, the Seattle Times reported that Hunt had repeatedly posted a doctored photo on social media, purporting to show him after a 2005 mortar attack. The photo was actually of two military policemen, not of Hunt. Hunt said a campaign volunteer posted it to his Facebook account, but took full responsibility for the posting. When questioned about medals and various deployments he had listed on his official and campaign biographies, Hunt then deleted references to the Air Force Commendation Medal, the Iraq Campaign Medal, the Afghanistan Campaign Medal as well as all references to being deployed to either Iraq or Afghanistan.

In the ensuing controversy, Hunt released both a Certificate of Release or Discharge from Active Duty (DD-214) and the Air National Guard equivalent (NGB-22), however neither document showed he served in Iraq or Afghanistan or earned any of the medals he had since deleted from his online biographies. Hunt's DD-214 also stated he had served in a classified location from 2002 until 2003.

On February 2, 2016, Hunt announced his immediate resignation.

On June 1, 2016 the Air Force Personnel Center issued Hunt a new DD-214 for his active duty service that ended in 2005. The new record credited Hunt with the Air Force Expeditionary Service Ribbon With Gold Border  According to the Air Force, the gold border is authorized for "individuals who were engaged in conducting or supporting combat operations in a designated combat zone," a designation given to several countries in the CENTCOM region. The new records also stated Hunt received the Global War on Terrorism Expeditionary Medal, awarded for deployments in the CENTCOM Area of Operations. Air Force Achievement Medal, Combat Readiness Medal, Air Reserve Forces Meritorious Service Medal with 5 Oak Leaf Clusters, National Defense Service Medal, Nuclear Deterrence Operations Service Medal, and the Armed Forces Reserve Medal with 1 Hourglass Device. However, they did not support Hunt's claims of receiving the Air Force Commendation Medal, the Iraq Campaign Medal, or the Afghanistan Campaign Medal, and did not indicate if Hunt had served in Iraq or Afghanistan although the USAF Personnel Center did note that Hunt's service in Operation Southern Watch and Operation Iraqi Freedom was the reason he was awarded the Air Force Expeditionary Service Ribbon with Gold Border and further noted that it is a rarity that an airman would receive both the Iraq campaign medal and the Expeditionary Service Ribbon. Hunt stated he listed the medals incorrectly and this was simply a mistake. Hunt has been awarded more medals than he ever claimed, though a couple medals were of different significance.

In 2019, it was reported that Hunt was a member of the Coalition of Western States (COWS), a group founded by Washington state representative Matt Shea that has been accused of involvement in domestic terrorism.

Awards 
 2014 Guardians of Small Business award. Presented by NFIB.

References

External links

1979 births
Living people
Republican Party members of the Washington House of Representatives
Washington (state) city council members
People from Orting, Washington